The linear range is that range of input or output values for which an electronic amplifier produces an output signal that is a direct, linear function of the input signal. That is, the output can be represented by the equation:

Output = Input × Gain

When operating in the linear range, no clipping occurs. If an amplifier were perfectly linear, no distortion (harmonic distortion or intermodulation distortion) would occur (although random noise may still be introduced).

Vacuum tube amplifiers tend to exhibit soft clipping; as they approach the maximum possible output value, the gain tends to drop, rounding the tops of the signal waveform. Transistor amplifiers, by comparison, tend to produce hard clipping; the gain remains approximately the same until the maximum possible output voltage is reached; at that point, hard clipping occurs and the waveform never exceeds that value. The sharp inflection points thus produced in the output waveform tend to have many more high-order harmonics. This is alleged to be the basis of the "transistor sound" that some audiophiles find offensive (although this would not have occurred if they would not have been driving their amplifiers beyond the linear range in the first place).

See also
Transfer function
Audio system measurements

Electrical parameters